Irish Shipping Limited was an Irish state-owned deep sea shipping company, formed during World War II for the purpose of supplying the country's import needs. Its ships were usually named after trees. Its contribution to Irish neutrality was recognised by the government after the war. In the post-war years the company continued to operate as a commercial strategic reserve until 1984 when, as a result of taking on a series of expensive long-term time charters, it was forced into liquidation.

Background
Ireland had declared its neutrality when hostilities broke out and in the early years of the war much of its food needs were carried on board Allied vessels. The Irish government realised that they needed to be more independent and self-sufficient. In February 1941, Seán Lemass, the Minister for Supplies stated that "The creation of an Irish mercantile marine was necessary, as it was as important for the national safety as the Army".

On 21 March 1941, Irish Shipping Limited was formed as a company majority owned by the state, which held 51% of the shares. % were owned by Grain Importers Ireland Ltd and the three largest shipping companies in the state, Wexford Steamship Company, Limerick Steamship Company and Palgrave Murphy Limited, held % each. Each of the shareholders also had a representative on the board. Unfortunately the new company had a major problem in that it had no ships and needed to acquire some. Lemass's ministerial secretary John Leydon became the first chairman of Irish Shipping.

The wartime fleet
Ships of all forms and in all conditions were a very scarce resource during the early years of the war. The company management took control of whatever tonnage, in whatever condition, they could lay their hands on. It had been abandoned following an attack by a German aircraft in the Bay of Biscay and towed into port by Spanish fishermen, where it was purchased by Irish Shipping.

List of ships operated during World War Two

Acquired in 1941
  (March 1941 – 1949) Ex Vassilios Destounis
  (28 July 1941 – November 1949) Ex Haifa Trader
  (13 May 1941 – 1948) Ex Cetvrti
  (August 1941 – 1949) Ex Leda
  (14 October 1941 – 1949) Ex Margara
  (17 June 1941 – 1943, 1945 – 1949) Ex Noemijulia
  (21 May 1941 – 15 May 1943) Ex West Neris
  (21 May 1941 – 16 November 1942) Ex West Hematite
  (26 December 1941 – 1 February 1947) Ex Arena
  (December 1941 – 1946) Ex Otto

Acquired in 1942
  1942 to 1946
  1942 to 1946
  1942 to 1949
  1942 to 1949

Acquired in 1943

Other ventures
The nature of the conflict and of the state meant that Irish Shipping had some unusual influences on its commercial operations. This led it into a number of other commercial ventures, most notably marine insurance and ship repair, where it might not necessarily have wanted to be.

A combination of the war, and that Irish vessels were sailing out of convoy, led to impossibly high premiums for goods carried in Irish ships. This encouraged the company to set up its own successful marine insurance business which it sold to the Insurance Corporation of Ireland after the war.

The post-war years

Ships acquired in 1948
As most of the original tonnage was in poor condition, in 1946 the company placed orders for eight vessels with British yards.
 new build (1948–1954)
 new build (1948–1954)
 new build (1948–1965)

Ships acquired in the 1950s
Several vessels of different types were delivered in the early 1950s, Irish Oak, was a near sister to the 1948 Irish Pine. Both of these vessels were steamships, with triple-expansion reciprocating engines, converted to motor vessels in the mid fifties and powered by Doxford diesel engines.
,  1953, steam triple expansion, 1953 to 1963
, 1950, (1950 to 1960)

Two sisterships were delivered in 1952 and 1954:
 1952 to 1964
 1954 to 1964
They were utilised on several routes and carried many varied cargoes.

Three sisterships were delivered in 1956,
 1956 to 1969
 1956 to 1969
 1956 to 1969
These were smaller vessels, with accommodation aft and twin holds. Originally designed primarily for Baltic trading they were utilized on the North Atlantic and even saw service in South America and the far north of Canada in Hudson Bay.

The following dry cargo vessels built for Irish Shipping during the mid-1950s and were powered by Doxford opposed-piston engines.
 1956 to 1968
 1958 to 1970
 1956 to 1968
 1957 to 1968

Two steam turbine ships were owned and operated:
 , 1957–1972
 , 1956–1972
Due to the sharp increase in the price of oil and the greater thermal efficiencies of diesel engines, these were the last two steam powered ships to be operated by Irish Shipping. Both vessels were equipped with refrigerated cargo tweendecks for the carriage of frozen meat. They both survived to the early 1972, when the Irish Poplar was sold off, and the Irish Spruce ran aground in the Caribbean and was subsequently broken up for scrap.

The tankers
The  1954–1967,  1958–1965, and  1959–1965 were the only tankers ever operated by ISL. The Irish Hawthorn and Irish Blackthorn were steam turbine vessels and were sold in 1965. The Irish Holly was primarily a coastal oil tanker, triple expansion steam engine. This vessel survived in the fleet for some time after the two larger vessels.

Ships acquired in the 1960s
Two sisters delivered in the early 1960s. Laid down in the very late 1950s.
MV Irish Rowan: First vessel built in the newly formed Verolme Cork Dockyard. 1961. Powered by Doxford diesel engine.
MV Irish Sycamore: A sister of the Rowan with similar machinery, built in England.

Two other sister ships were operated:
  1963–1976   IHP 8,450 ON 400358 (c. 1963)
  1962–1976   BHP 7,250 ON 400269 (c. 1963)
The Irish Cedar operated the Cork-Casablanca-Dublin run importing phophate for Gouldings Ireland before the Irish Plane was used on the run. When the Irish Cedar was sold in the 1970s she was converted to an oil exploration vessel, a drill ship.
The Irish Plane operated on the Casablanca – Dublin – Cork run, importing phosphate fertiliser for several years.
Both of these sisters were powered by MAN diesel engines, type KZ70-120D

Ships acquired in the 1970s

The Star ships and the Elm

Irish Shipping entered a joint venture with the Norwegian Star Shipping company and operated two ships;
  1970-1978
  1970–1976

A bulk carrier with retractable/stackable car decks was also acquired;
  1968–1979   ON 400577 BHP 18,800. ON 400577
The Irish Elm was the second vessel built for Irish Shipping at Verolme Cork Dockyard and made her maiden voyage in 1969. The vessel was a new departure for the company being operated by a GPR (general purpose) crew. Each crew member had a cabin and the vessel had an officers and a crew bar. It also had a swimming pool. The accommodation, all aft was air conditioned. The main engine, a MAN, could be manoeuvred from the bridge.

She was designed to run with an unmanned machinery space, UMS, for night time sailing in open waters, however this was seldom, if ever achieved. There were many design problems with the UMS equipment, the main problem being that the electronics were germanium based rather than silicon. Silicon had not come to the fore as the most suitable semiconductor material. The germanium was affected by the high ambient temperatures in the engine room.

The vessel was primarily designed as a bulk carrier but had electro-hydraulic cranes and pontoon decks fitted after her sea trials. She operated for many years as a car carrier primarily transporting cars from Japan to the US and Europe. The Elm was sold in 1979.

A further mis-match of technology was the use of steam driven reciprocating feed pump for the exhaust gas boiler. Controlled by a pneumatic valve, the system required constant attention to ensure correct operation.

Celtic Bulk Carriers
In the early 1970s ISL set up a joint venture with Reardon Smiths called Celtic Bulk Carriers and between them ordered 12 standard ships from Govan Shipbuilders in Glasgow. The ships were referred to as Clyde-class and the Irish ships were named:
MV Irish Pine 1973–1983
 1973–
 1973–  Reg T 11360.88 ON 401220
 1973– ,  ON 401218 BHP 11600

The Japanese ships

The Spruce
Its ordering and build were the subject of much controversy with many feeling that the Irish government put undue pressure on the company to place the order to keep the dockyard open.

Managed vessels

The Rock Boats

Other managed vessels
Lough Beltra
Asgard II

Liquidation and aftermath
On 14 November 1984, the Irish government surprised most observers by placing Irish Shipping Ltd into liquidation. Maurice Tempany, a senior partner at Ernst & Young was appointed as official liquidator. He quickly set about laying-off the staff and making preparations for the sale of the ships. With four ships still owned by the company – Irish Maple, Irish Rowan, Irish Cedar and Irish Spruce – as each came into port it was arrested and eventually sold.

See also
 Irish neutrality (external issues)
 The Emergency (internal issues)
 Irish Mercantile Marine during World War II
 Maritime Institute of Ireland

References and sources

Legislation relating to Irish Shipping Ltd
Acts of the Oireachtas – The Parliament of Ireland
No. 10/1994: Irish Shipping Limited (Payments to Former Employees) Act, 1994
No. 8/1984: Irish Shipping Limited (Amendment) Act, 1984
No. 8/1982: Irish Shipping Limited Act, 1982
No. 39/1980: Irish Shipping Limited (Amendment) Act, 1980
No. 3/1959: Irish Shipping Limited (Amendment) Act, 1959
No. 37/1947: Irish Shipping Limited Act, 1947

Sources

External links
Irishships

Shipping companies of the Republic of Ireland
Transport companies established in 1941
Transport companies disestablished in 1984
Maritime history of Ireland
1941 establishments in Ireland
1984 disestablishments in Ireland